Schoonover Mountain House, also known as Schoonover Farm, is a historic home located in Delaware Water Gap National Recreation Area at Middle Smithfield Township, Monroe County, Pennsylvania.  The original section was built about 1850–1860, and enlarged at least three times by 1900.  It is a large, rambling two-story "L"-shaped frame banked dwelling.  It is five bays wide, has a slate covered gable roof, and features a one-story wraparound porch. It was owned by the locally prominent Schoonover family, and was operated during the late-19th and early-20th centuries as a vacation and boarding house.

It was added to the National Register of Historic Places in 1979.

References

Houses on the National Register of Historic Places in Pennsylvania
Houses in Monroe County, Pennsylvania
National Register of Historic Places in Monroe County, Pennsylvania